A baris is a type of ancient Egyptian ship, whose unique method of construction was described by Herodotus, writing in about . Archeologists and historians could find no corroboration of his description until the discovery of the remains of such a ship in the waters around Thonis-Heracleion in Aboukir Bay in 2003.

The ship, known as Ship 17, the first of 63 ships found in Thonis-Heraclion, measures up to 28 metres in length. It was constructed using an unusual technique to join thick wooden planks together, and had a distinctive steering mechanism with an axial rudder passing through the hull.   The underwater archaeological work was carried out by Franck Goddio and the European Institute for Underwater Archaeology, and the findings are being published in a book by Alexander Belov for the Oxford Centre for Maritime Archaeology.

Etymology
Some etymologists and linguists hypothesize that the french word barge, from whence the english word barge is derived, as well as the spanish word barco and the italian word barca may be derived from the latin barica, which comes from the word baris, itself from the greek( (bâris), making the Italian barca, the french and english barge, and the spanish barco all related to the word baris.  Furthermore, the Online Etymology Dictionary suggests that it is traditionally related to the Celtic *par, itself perhaps from Gaulish, from whence was derived the name of the Parisii (Gaul) (singular Parisius), the celtic tribe which lends its name to the city of Paris; this argument, however, is etymologically dubious; with several other hypotheses being recorded, including one from Alfred Holder linking it to the Parisii to the stem *pario-, meaning "cauldron".

References

Further reading

Archaeology of shipwrecks
Ancient ships
Ancient Egyptian technology
Ancient Egyptian ships
Ship types